Elections to the Odisha Legislative Assembly were held in April 2004 to elect members of the 147 constituencies in Odisha, India. The Indian National Congress won the popular vote, but the Biju Janata Dal won a majority of seats and Naveen Patnaik was re-appointed as the Chief Minister of Odisha. The number of constituencies was set as 147 by the recommendation of the Delimitation Commission of India.

Result

Elected members

By-polls

See also
List of constituencies of the Odisha Legislative Assembly
2004 elections in India

References

Odisha
State Assembly elections in Odisha
2000s in Orissa